William H. Loughran  (1862–1917) was a 19th-century Major League Baseball player who played catcher for the 1884 New York Gothams of the National League.

References

External links

1862 births
1917 deaths
19th-century baseball players
Baseball players from New York (state)
Major League Baseball catchers
New York Gothams players
Binghamton Bingoes players
Binghamton Crickets (1880s) players
Burials at Calvary Cemetery (Queens)